The Matubhum Party (Thai: พรรคมาตุภูมิ, Phak Matubhum, English: Motherland Party) is a minor political party in Thailand, founded in November 2008. It mainly represents the interests of the Muslim minority in Thailand Southern provinces. It is led by General Sonthi Boonyaratglin.

Forerunner of the Matubhum Party was the Wahdah faction (Arab for Unity), initially a cross-party group of Muslim parliamentarians led by Wan Muhamad Noor Matha. The majority of the Wahdah faction joined the New Aspiration Party and later the Thai Rak Thai Party of Prime Minister Thaksin Shinawatra, to achieve improvements for the Muslim population in the South. After Thaksin's use of brutal force against the insurgency in the three southernmost provinces, the faction fell out with Thaksin and the Thai Rak Thai Party. After the 2006 Thai coup d'état, most Wahdah members joined the Neutral Democratic Party and were later spread among Puea Pandin Party, Ratsadon Party, and Pheu Thai Party. In November 2008, the Muslim politicians formed the Matubhum Party.

The Muslim general Sonthi Boonyaratglin, from 2005 to 2007 Commander-in-Chief of the Army, leader of the 2006 coup d'état, and chairman of the military junta, joined the party in November 2009, and immediately became party leader. Sonthi oriented the party on neutrality between "Red Shirts" and "Yellow Shirts" and reconciliation of the Southern Muslims with Buddhist Thais, especially the Islamist rebels and the government.

In the 2011 general election, the party won two seats, one for the party-list and one constituency-based in Pattani Province. It is in the opposition against the government of Yingluck Shinawatra.

Matubhum Party was dissolved on 27 December 2018. Most of its members joined the Prachachart Party.

References

External links
Official Website (in Thai)

Defunct political parties in Thailand
Political parties established in 2008
2008 establishments in Thailand
Political parties disestablished in 2018
2018 disestablishments in Thailand